Kent Karlsson (born 25 November 1945) is a Swedish football coach and former player.
He was capped 38 times for the national team and played at the 1974 FIFA World Cup.
As a manager, he has managed Swedish, Danish and Norwegian clubs such as IFK Norrköping, Bryne IL, Lyngby BK and FC Copenhagen.

References

External links

1945 births
Living people
People from Arboga Municipality
Swedish footballers
Sweden international footballers
Åtvidabergs FF players
1974 FIFA World Cup players
1978 FIFA World Cup players
Swedish football managers
Bryne FK managers
F.C. Copenhagen managers
Assyriska FF managers
IFK Norrköping managers
Kongsvinger IL Toppfotball managers
Örebro SK managers
Åtvidabergs FF managers
Expatriate football managers in Denmark
Swedish expatriate football managers
Swedish expatriate sportspeople in Norway
Expatriate football managers in Norway
Lyngby Boldklub managers
IFK Eskilstuna players
Association football defenders
Sportspeople from Västmanland County